Neuss Central Station is the railway station for the city of Neuss in the German state of North Rhine-Westphalia. The main station building is built on a platform between the tracks and it is located at the junction of the Lower Left Rhine Railway (Linksniederrheinische Strecke, Cologne–Kleve) and the Mönchengladbach–Düsseldorf railway. These lines also connect with the Düren–Neuss railway and the Neuss–Viersen railway; the latter has ended since 1984 at Kaarster See station and is operated by the private Regiobahn company.

The station is a transport hub, served by various rail services, a Stadtbahn line, a tram line and a bus station with eight bays in the station forecourt. Neuss station houses several shops, including a restaurant, a snack bar and a kiosk. In 2006, it was modernised, with two of its four platforms equipped with lifts for wheelchair users. It is classified by Deutsche Bahn as a category 2 station.

History

Neuss station was opened in 1853, along with the line from Aachen. A rail connection to Cologne followed in 1855. In 1875/76, the second station building was built.  The current station building was opened at the same location in 2003. The station was extensively remodelled with the opening of the Rhine-Ruhr S-Bahn lines S11 (opened in 1985) and S 8 (1988).

Remodelling

The planning firm of Jaspert, Steffens, Watrin und Drehsen of Cologne was commissioned with the development of a concept design for the development of the station in cooperation with the city of Neuss. The focus was mainly on the station forecourt, the entrance building, the transport facilities of the station itself and its environment. The concept consists of eight modules, which could be realised independently. The so-called Masterplan NRW also provided for the development of the rail infrastructure. Deutsche Bahn, the Verkehrsverbund Rhein-Ruhr and the state of North Rhine-Westphalia signed up to the plan was on 11 December 2008. The modernisation plan was funded with €767,000. In the second stage of the operation, Modernisierungsoffensive (modernisation drive) 2, Neuss station was rebuilt in the 2nd half of 2012. Among other things, all platforms gained a lift, the floor covering was renewed and auxiliary systems for the visually impaired were installed.

Operations

Long-distance services 

Since the timetable change in December 2009, Neuss Hauptbahnhof has again been served by long-distance services:
 An Intercity-Express connects Neuss with Berlin Ostbahnhof  (and Mönchengladbach in the other direction) on Fridays and Sundays.
An Intercity from Aachen stops in Neuss on its journey to Berlin Südkreuz. The return trip runs from Leipzig via Neuss and continues via Mönchengladbach and Aachen to Cologne.

Local services

The station is served by the following seven regional services (January 2017):

Platform usage

In general, rail services use the platforms as follows:

Bus routes

Neuss station is served by a Stadtbahn line, a tram line, twelve bus routes and six night bus routes.

Planning

The new Düsseldorf Stadtbahn line, U81, is planned from the commercial area of Hammelfeld or possibly from Rheinpark-Center station via Neuss station and continuing via Lörick, the Messe Düsseldorf and the Düsseldorf Airport to Ratingen. This project is currently postponed due to lack of funding.

References

Railway stations in North Rhine-Westphalia
Hauptbahnhof
S8 (Rhine-Ruhr S-Bahn)
Rhine-Ruhr S-Bahn stations
S28 (Rhine-Ruhr S-Bahn)
S11 (Rhine-Ruhr S-Bahn)
Buildings and structures in Rhein-Kreis Neuss
Railway stations in Germany opened in 1853
1853 establishments in Prussia